Anka Leśniak is a Polish contemporary artist, born and educated in Łódź. She specialises in installation art, performance, video art and painting.

She has presented her work in more than 80 individual and group exhibitions. The majority of her work concerns the history of women. The artist often conveys this theme through site-specific pieces.

Education 
In 2003 the artist received a degree in Art History at the University of Łódź, and then in 2004 received a diploma with honors from the Academy of Fine Arts in Lodz (Faculty of Visual Education - currently Visual Arts). In 2011 Leśniak was awarded a scholarship from the Ministry of Culture and National Heritage. In 2015 she received the Scholarship of President of Lodz. In 2016, she received the Cultural Scholarship of the City of Gdańsk and became a scholarship holder of the Contact Cultures and the Austrian Government as part of the Artists-in-Residence 2016 program in Vienna. In 2016 she was awarded a PhD in the field of fine arts from the Academy of Fine Arts in Gdańsk, Faculty of Sculpture and Intermedia.

Inspirations and topics 
The main inspiration of Anka Leśniak's work are women active in Poland during the partitions of Poland, and during the First and Second World War. She often pays tribute to the unsung heroes of the Polish Resistance and these are, in many cases, symbolic heroines. Their names are often allegorised.

Pre-war fashion photographs are an inspiration to the artist.

The artist is interested in the values observed by society, especially women, in the past—honor, integrity and homeland. The women Leśniak portrays are independent, strong, fearless, ready-to-act, virtuous, in no way inferior to men.

The artist is also interested in issues to do with gender, the body, definitions of femininity and perceptions of women.

Scholarships / awards 
2002

Scholarship in Staatliche Akademie der Bildenden Künste, Stuttgart

2004

Diploma with honors. Academy of Fine Arts in Lodz

2011

Scholarship of Minister of Culture and National Heritage

2015

Scholarship of President of the City of Lodz for people involved in artistic creation and culture animation

2016

Scholarship KulturKontakt, Vienna, Austria and Scholarship Cultural Cities of Gdansk

Selected exhibitions and projects

Individual exhibitions 
2005

 AKTywistki Gallery In Blanco, BOK, Lodz
 AKTualności, Academic Hub of Creative Initiatives, Lodz

2007

 Printemps czyli Wiosna w Domku Ogrodnika, initiative and video-art from the cycle Body Printing, Patio Art Center, Lodz
 Primavera czyli Wiosna w Gabinecie Grohmana, initiative from the cycle Body Printing Museum of the Artistic Books, Lodz
 Body Printing Studio STUDIO BWA, Wroclaw

2008

 Body Printing - Installation from the series Presentations of contemporary art, Academic Center for Artistic Initiative, Lodz
 Piękne i BESTie multimedia project, Ateneum Gallery, Warsaw

2009

 Nie o to chodzi, by złapać króliczka, lecz by gonić go, Patio Art Center, Lodz
 TOP Models, Studio Gallery, Palace of Culture, Warsaw

2010

 Fading Traces, /Fokus Łódź Biennale 2010/ Manhattan Gallery, Lodz
 Body of Art, Newest Art Gallery, Gorzów Wielkopolski
 Muzy Łodzi Kaliskiej, Atlas of Art, Łódź
 Body Printing Epicentrum, Epicentrum Gallery, Jastrzębie Zdrój

2011

 Zarejestrowane, Galeria ON, Poznań
 Fading Traces, Galeria ON, Poznań
 Fading Traces, Lokal_30, Warszawa

2012

 Zarejestrowane, Museum of Cinematography Lodz
 Zarejestrowane, Entropia Gallery, Wroclaw

2014

 Taniec Bociana, as part of the project Relokacje, Bydgoszcz
 Wcielenia , BWA Olsztyn
 Herstory, meeting, demonstration of documentation, Gdnńsk City Gallery, Gdansk

2015

 Invisible inVisible, Wschodnia Gallery, Lodz
 Fifi Zastrow. Acta est fabula, installation in public space, ul. Jaracza 34, Lodz
 Michalina zuch dziewczyna, installation in public space, ul. Zachodnia 27A, Lodz
 Eugenia żeni się installation in public space, ul. Drukarska 2, Lodz

2016

 Invisible inVisible / Niewidzialne Widzialnego, Gdansk City Gallery, Gdansk 
 Zastrzegam sobie wyłączne posiadanie swego życia, installation inspired by a character Stanisława Przybyszewska, Plac Wałowy 13, Gdansk 
 patRIOTki, XX1 Gallery, Warsaw

2017

 INNE - Invisible inVisible / Niewidzialne Widzialnego, Wozownia Gallery, Toruń
 Dla Zofii / Kwiat dla Zofii, site-specific artwork in public space, Main Train Station in Leszno

Group exhibitions 

2005

 Yearbook 2004, exhibition of the best diplomas of the Academy of Fine Arts in Łódź, Central Museum of Textiles, Lodz
 International Film Festival Offensiva, Wroclaw
 Akt-Reaktywacja, exhibition of works by graduates of the Drawing and Painting Workshop ad. Włodzimierz Stelmaszczyk, Forum Gallery, Downtown Cultural Forum, Lodz

2006

 Young Art Fair, project Ptasie Radio, Toruń
 II Artistic Meetings Aspekty: Pokolenie Porno, Bed Art - audiovisual project, Gallery of Young Promotion, BOK, Lodz
 Binary City Lodz - Warsaw, Manhattan Gallery, Lodz

2007

 From Warsaw to Lodz, Manhattan Gallery, Lodz
 Homeless Gallery, Tolerance - Intolerance, Patio Art Center, Lodz
 Visual Education, a jubilee exhibition of the work of graduates of the Department of Visual Education at the Academy of Fine Arts in Lodz, Museum of the City of Lodz 
 Disenchantment, Project in urban space, BWA Zielona Góra

2008

 Disenchantment - a continuous process, BWA Awangarda, Wroclaw
 Sexhibition, Creative Workshop Lubelska, Warsaw
 Prints for Peace, Gallery Lepoldo Carpinteyro de Relaciones Culturales, Monterrey, Mexico

2009

 Passing Through, KunstPunkt, Berlin
 Art after hours, CSW Łaźnia, Gdansk
 28 days, CCA Łaźnia Gdansk

2010

 Metasurvival. Producers of contexts in the face of change , Gallery Spiż7, Gdansk
 International Art Workshops R.I.V.E.R., Provincia Ancona, Italy

2011

 Registrations, Representations, and membership exhibition of the Art and Documentation Association, East Gallery, Lodz

2012

 PAN ASIA - Performance Art Network Asia, Seoul, Korea
 Ja Lodzermensch, Manhattan Gallery, Lodz
 Transart Communication Festival, Koszyce, Slovakia
 Silesia Art Biennale 
 Ephemeral Fixed. Ephemeral art - history documented. Ephemeral art in the Visegrad countries. Wschodnia Gallery, Lodz
 2nd Member Exhibition of the Art and Documentation Association, Wschodnia Gallery, Lodz

2013

 Live Galleries, Wschodnia Gallery, Exchange Gallery. Lodz Networks since 1978. Maerz Kunstlervereinigung, Linz, Austria 
 No Women No Art, Poznań. Podejrzana project in the urban space of Wild's veneration
 Name of the Father? Name of the Mother! exhibition of Polish and Korean artists, Gardener's House, Park Źródliska, Lodz
 3rd Member Exhibition of the Art and Documentation Association, Wschodnia Gallery, Lodz

2014

 Dzieci z Fabryki / Reborn Babies, Play Poland Film Festival, Meow photography studios, Edinburgh, Scotland
 We+Our+Us, Bupyeong Arts Center, Incheon / Tongyeong Citizen's Centre, Tongyeong, South Korea
 Getto XXI, exhibition accompanying the celebration of the 70th anniversary of liquidation Litzmannstadt Getto, Monopolis, Lodz
 4th Member Exhibition of the Art and Documentation Association, Wschodnia Gallery, Lodz

2015

 What do I have from a woman?, Visual Culture Research Center, Kijów, Ukraine
 Punkty Styczne, exhibition of PhD students at the Academy of Fine Arts in Gdansk, The Baltic Sea Cultural Center, Center of St. John, Gdansk 
 Rozpakować walizki/Koffer auspacken, Koelmann Höfe Factory, Frankfurt on the Oder, Germany
 V Wystawa członkowska Stowarzyszenia Sztuka i Dokumentacja, Wschodnia Gallery, Lodz

2016

 Transcultural Emancipation, Fluc, Vienna 
 6 Member Exhibition of the Art and Documentation Association, Wschodnia Gallery, Lodz

2017

 re_form OSTRALE BIENNALE, Drezno, Germany
 Weź Szminkę / Take a lipstick, performance as part of an experiment project FUNom, Wozownia Gallery, Toruń
 Kobiety, które siedzą w Łodzi, group exhibition FRAKCJA, Manhattan Transfer Gallery, Lodz

2018

 Gniazdo / The Nest, Aula Gallery.Academy of Fine Arts in Gdansk
 Tylko jeden dzień. Manifest Obceności  performance of group FRAKCJA, Fashon House Limanka, Lodz
 7 exhibition of members and members of the Art and Documentation Association, Wschodnia Gallery, Lodz

References 

Year of birth missing (living people)
Living people
21st-century Polish artists
Polish contemporary artists
Polish women artists